Montcalm was a F70 type anti-submarine frigate of the French Marine Nationale. The French Navy does not use the term "destroyer" for any of its ships; hence some of the larger ships, referred to as "frigates", are registered as destroyers. She was the fourth French vessel named after the 18th century general marquess Louis de Montcalm de Saint Véran.

Operational history
Montcalm was involved in operations off Libya during the 2011 Libyan Civil War. The vessel was used to evacuate French and British citizens from the nation after fighting closed the airports.  From 13 to 26 October 2014, the frigate took part in the large international operational exercise Catamaran 2014 that practiced an amphibious assault. Montcalm was decommissioned on 3 July 2017. The hull was then stripped and brought to Brégaillon to await final disposal.

References

External links

Georges Leygues-class frigates
Frigates of France
1980 ships
Ships built in France